Cyclic guanosine monophosphate–adenosine monophosphate (cyclic GMP-AMP, cGAMP) is the first cyclic di-nucleotide found in metazoa.  
In mammalian cells, cGAMP is synthesized by cyclic GMP-AMP synthase (cGAS) from ATP and GTP upon cytosolic DNA stimulation. cGAMP produced by cGAS contains mixed phosphodiester linkages, with one between 2'-OH of GMP and 5'-phosphate of AMP and the other between 3'-OH of AMP and 5'-phosphate of GMP.

This molecule, referred to as 2′3′-cGAMP (cyclic [G(2’,5’)pA(3’,5’)p]), functions as an endogenous second messenger inducing STING-dependent type I interferon response. cGAMP has also been shown to be an effective adjuvant that boosts the production of antigen-specific antibodies and T cell responses in mice.  cGAMP exercises antiviral functions in the cell where it is produced, but can also cross cell membranes by passive diffusion through gap junctions to exert effects on neighboring cells.  It may even be packaged into lentivirus (such as HIV-1), poxvirus and herpes virus, and under cell culture conditions has been found to transmit an antiviral signal to the cells infected with these viruses; however, there is reason to think that at least HIV is capable of evading this mechanism by some means.

In recent years, cGAMP signalling has been identified in prokaryotes including Vibrio cholerae which express a bacterial analogue of cGAS. In these organisms, cGAS is encoded as part of an operon alongside cGAMP-activated phospholipases (e.g. CapV in V. cholerae). During infection by bacteriophage, cGAS is activated and cGAMP is synthesised, activating CapV which degrades the cell's membrane and triggers cell death before the phage can complete its replicatory cycle.

References 

Nucleotides
Cyclic nucleotides